The Grand National Lawn Tennis Tournament  was an early Victorian era outdoor grass court tennis tournament staged only one time between June and July 1879 at The Hyde, Hendon, Middlesex, England.

History 
The Grand National Tennis Tournament  was outdoor grass court tennis tournament staged only one time between June and July 1879 at The Hyde, Hendon, Middlesex, England. This tournament began on 30 June. Heavy rain interrupted play from the quarter-finals onwards, and final was eventually played on 31 July 1879. The tournament featured a number of the leading tennis players of the day including Herbert Lawford, Otway Woodhouse, Henry Lyle Mulholland and William Cecil Marshall. 34 players entered the draw and the men's  singles title was won by Britain's Edgar Lubbcock who defeated Scotland's Lestocq Robert Erskine.

Finals

Men's singles

References

Sources 
 Authors, Various (30 July 2022). Routledge Library Editions: Sports Studies. London: Taylor & Francis. ISBN 978-1-317-67949-3.
 Bowles, T. G.; Fry, O. A. (1879). Vanity Fair. (1879). London: England.
 Nieuwland, Alex. "Grand National Tournament 1879". www.tennisarchives.com. Netherlands: Tennis Archives.
 The Illustrated London News. (1879). London, England: Elm House.

Defunct tennis tournaments in the United Kingdom
Grass court tennis tournaments
Tennis tournaments in England